Eudaldo Báez Galib is a Puerto Rican politician and former senator. He was a member of the Senate of Puerto Rico from 1993 to 2005.

Biography

Báez Galib was born in Mayagüez, Puerto Rico. He received a Bachelor's degree in Political Science and Economy from the University of Puerto Rico, and then graduated from the University of Puerto Rico School of Law in 1965.  He is a member of Phi Sigma Alpha fraternity.

After graduating, Báez Galib worked as a private attorney from 1965 to 1985. He presided the Puerto Rico Bar Association several times, as well as being a member of the Board.

In 1985, Governor of Puerto Rico Rafael Hernández Colón appointed him as Electoral Commissioner of the Popular Democratic Party (PPD). In 1989, he was also appointed as Secretary General of the party, occupying both positions until 1992.

Báez Galib was elected to the Senate of Puerto Rico for the first time at the 1992 general elections through the Minority Law of Puerto Rico. He was reelected in 1996, 2000, and 2004.

During his last term, he presided the Commission of Government and Work Affairs, Consumer Affairs, and Government Reports, among others.

Báez Galib is married to Elba Rivera. They have four children together.

References

External links
Eudaldo Báez Galib on SenadoPR (through Wayback Machine)

People from Mayagüez, Puerto Rico
Living people
Democratic Party (Puerto Rico) politicians
Puerto Rican people of Lebanese descent
Members of the Senate of Puerto Rico
Popular Democratic Party (Puerto Rico) politicians
Year of birth missing (living people)